James Rochfort Maguire   (4 October 1855 – 18 April 1925) was a British imperialist and Irish Nationalist politician and MP in the House of Commons of the United Kingdom of Great Britain and Ireland. As a member of the Irish Parliamentary Party he represented North Donegal (1890–92) and as a Parnellite Member he represented West Clare (1892–95). He was a friend and associate of Cecil Rhodes (1853–1902), and was one of the three men who signed the original concession on which was based the British South Africa Company, of which he was president in 1923–25.

Life and career
He was the second son of John Mullock Maguire, rector of Kilkeedy, co. Limerick, and his wife Anne Jane née Humphreys. He was educated at Cheltenham College and Merton College, Oxford, where he obtained first classes in mathematics and jurisprudence. He was elected a Fellow of All Souls College, Oxford in 1878 and was called to the bar in 1883, although he never practised the law. He married Julia Beatrice, eldest daughter of Viscount Peel, a former Speaker of the House of Commons, in 1895.

While at Oxford, Maguire became friendly with Cecil Rhodes. In 1888, Rhodes sent him with Charles Rudd and Francis Thompson to negotiate a concession of land and mineral rights in Matabeleland from Chief Lobengula at Bulawayo. This was signed on 30 October. The British South Africa Company was chartered the following October and Maguire was associated with it for the rest of his life.

Meanwhile, in 1888, Rhodes had reached an agreement with Parnell, whom he admired. Rhodes supported Home Rule for Ireland, but saw it as only part of an Imperial federal scheme for the whole British Empire in which all the self-governing territories would send members to the Imperial Parliament.  He therefore objected to the terms of Gladstone's unsuccessful Home Rule Bill of 1886, which would have ended Irish representation at Westminster. He gave Parnell £10,000 for the Irish Party's funds in exchange for an undertaking that the Party would promote the continuation of Irish members at Westminster (in the event both later Home Rule Bills, in 1893 and 1912, did provide for this).

Maguire, who shared Rhodes' admiration for Parnell, became the main link between Rhodes and Parnell, and a seat was found for him at an uncontested by-election at North Donegal in June 1890. Less than six months later, however, the Irish Party split over Parnell's leadership. Maguire continued his support for Parnell, and, after Parnell's death in October 1891, for the embattled Parnellites. This meant that he was faced with a real fight at the general election of 1892. Then, he contested West Clare, defeating the Anti-Parnellite candidate convincingly by over 1,000 votes. However, at the following general election in 1895, after the destruction of the second Home Rule Bill by the House of Lords in 1894, Maguire lost the seat to a fresh Anti-Parnellite candidate, by 403 votes.

His later career was almost entirely concerned with South and central Africa. He went through the Siege of Kimberley in the Boer War with Rhodes, accompanied by his wife. After Rhodes' death in 1902, Maguire carried on his work as a businessman, in the British South Africa Company, as a director of the Consolidated Gold Fields of South Africa, and particularly in the development of the Rhodesian railway system of which he was chairman for many years.

He was appointed a Commander of the Order of the British Empire in the 1918 New Year Honours for his efforts during the First World War.

According to The Times, among dozens of friends and associates from his imperial career who attended his funeral on 24 April 1925, there was only one representative of the Irish nationalist movement, namely his former Parnellite colleague John O'Connor.

Publications
The pioneers of empire: Being a vindication of the principle and a short sketch of the history of chartered companies, with especial reference to the British South Africa Company, London, Methuen, 1896
Cecil Rhodes: A biography and appreciation (Macmillan's colonial library), 1897
The case of Ireland: "The Times" proposal. My suggestions, 1919
"Rhodesia," Journal of the African Society (continued as African Affairs), Vol.22 No.86, January 1923, pp. 81–95

References

Sources
Irish Independent, 20 April 1925, pp. 6 and 7
F. S. L. Lyons, Charles Stewart Parnell, London, Collins, 1977, pp. 442–4, 587–9

The Times, 20 and 23 April 1925
Brian M. Walker (ed.), Parliamentary Election Results in Ireland, 1801–1922, Dublin, Royal Irish Academy, 1978
Who Was Who 1916–1928

External links 
 
Portrait photo of James Rochford Maguire’s wife Julia, née Peel (National Portrait Gallery, London)
 Social network diagram for James Rochfort Maguire (based on shared entry on same pages) (Archive)
 

1855 births
1925 deaths
Irish Protestants
Irish Parliamentary Party MPs
UK MPs 1892–1895
Protestant Irish nationalists
Parnellite MPs
Irish non-fiction writers
Irish male non-fiction writers
Politicians from County Limerick
Fellows of All Souls College, Oxford
Commanders of the Order of the British Empire
Members of the Parliament of the United Kingdom for County Donegal constituencies (1801–1922)
Members of the Parliament of the United Kingdom for County Clare constituencies (1801–1922)